Birthdays is the second studio album from English musician Keaton Henson. It was released in April 2013 under Oak Ten Records.

Track listing 
All songs written by Keaton Henson
Teach Me - 4:25
10am, Gare du Nord - 3:58
You - 4:42
Lying to You - 3:47
The Best Today - 4:29
Don't Swim - 4:56
Kronos - 4:10
Beekeeper - 4:13
Sweetheart, What Have You Done to Us - 3:30
In the Morning - 4:01

Deluxe edition tracks
Milk Teeth - 3:51
If I Don't Have To - 3:36
On the News - 3:22

Charts

Personnel 
Keaton Henson - Vocals, Guitar

Additional musicians (6, 7)
Dave Levita - Guitar 
Justin Meldal-Johnsen - Bass
Zac Rae - Keyboards
Matt Chamberlain - Drums

Production
Joe Chiccarelli - producer, mixing
Chris Sheldon - mixing (7)
Ben Phillips - mixing (4, 5, 9)
Geoff Neal, Bill Mims - engineering
Brian Lucey - mastering

Design personnel
Keaton Henson - artwork, drawings
Sophie Harris-Taylor - photography

References

2013 albums
Anti- (record label) albums
Keaton Henson albums
Albums produced by Joe Chiccarelli